Reinert is a surname. Notable people with the surname include:

Al Reinert (1947–2018), American journalist and film producer
Alexander A. Reinert, professor of law
Bianca Reinert (c.1966–2018), Brazilian ornithologist
Emil-Edwin Reinert (1903–1953), French film director and screenwriter
Emmanuel Reinert
Erik S. Reinert (born 1949), Norwegian economist
Ernst-Wilhelm Reinert (1919–2007), German military aviator
Gesine Reinert, statistician at Oxford
Johan Reinert Reiersen (1810–1864), Norwegian-American writer
Katrin Reinert (born 1988), German rower
Paul C. Reinert (1910–2001), president of Saint Louis University
Rick Reinert (1925–2018), American animator
Robert Reinert (1872–1928), German film director and screenwriter
Roger Reinert (born 1970), American politician
Sean Reinert (1971–2020), American drummer
Sebastian Reinert (born 1987), German footballer
Susan Reinert (died 1979), American murder victim

Surnames from given names